The 2020–21 Israeli Basketball Premier League, for sponsorship reasons Ligat Winner, was the 67th season of the Israeli Basketball Premier League.

Format
The regular season will be played in a 26-round Round-Robin format.
The top 6 finishers will play the 5 round "upper house", with the other 7 teams playing the 7 round "bottom group".
The 6 upper group teams, joined by the top 2 teams from the bottom group, will play the originally planned to be Best-of-5 Quarter finals as Best-of-3 series.
The Semi finals and Finals will also be played as Best-of-3 series.

Teams

Hapoel Haifa and Bnei Herzliya have been promoted to the league after placing the top two places of the 2019–20 Liga Leumit.

Stadia and locations

Personnel and sponsorship

Managerial changes

Regular season

Rounds 1 to 26

Top-teams League Group

Positions by games played

Bottom-Teams League Group

Positions by Round

Playoffs

Quarterfinals

|}
Source:

Game 1

Game 2

Game 3

Semifinals

|}

Game 1

Game 2

Finals

|}

Awards

MVP of the Round

Monthly Awards

Player of the Month

Israeli Player of the Month

Coach of the Month

Yearly awards

Israeli clubs in European competitions

References

 
Israeli Basketball Premier League seasons
Israeli
Basketball